Gyracanthus (from  , 'curved' and  , 'spine') is an extinct genus of acanthodian.

See also
 List of acanthodians

References 

Devonian fish of Africa
Carboniferous fish of Europe
Devonian fish of North America
Devonian fish of South America
Carboniferous fish of North America
Acanthodii genera
Carboniferous acanthodians
Devonian acanthodians
Taxa named by Louis Agassiz